Queen Daowu, of the Wei lineage of the Ji clan of Wei (悼武后 姬姓 魏氏), a princess of Wei by birth (4th century BC), was the queen consort of King Wu of Qin, who reigned from 310 to 307 BC.

References 

4th-century BC births
4th-century BC deaths
Qin royal consorts
4th-century BC Chinese women
4th-century BC Chinese people